Big Falls may refer to a location:

United States

Big Falls, a waterfall in Idaho
Big Falls, Minnesota, a city
Big Falls (Missouri River waterfall), near Great Falls, Montana
Big Falls, a waterfall on the Elk River (North Carolina–Tennessee)
Big Falls (Oregon), a waterfall near Terrebonne
Big Falls, Rusk County, Wisconsin, a town
Big Falls, Waupaca County, Wisconsin, a village

Other countries
Big Falls, Belize, a village in Toledo District
Several waterfalls in Nova Scotia, Canada